Prosopogmus is a genus of beetles in the family Carabidae, containing the following species:

 Prosopogmus aoupiniensis Will, 2011
 Prosopogmus austrinus Sloane, 1895
 Prosopogmus boisduvalii (Castelnau, 1867)
 Prosopogmus chalybeipennis (Chaudoir, 1843)
 Prosopogmus delicatulus Tschitscherine, 1898
 Prosopogmus fortis Will, 2011
 Prosopogmus foveipennis (Macleay, 1871)
 Prosopogmus harpaloides (Chaudoir, 1874)
 Prosopogmus impressifrons (Chaudoir, 1865)
 Prosopogmus insperatus Sloane, 1896
 Prosopogmus interstitialis Sloane, 1923
 Prosopogmus irideus Fauvel, 1903
 Prosopogmus leai Sloane, 1920
 Prosopogmus lescheni Will, 2011
 Prosopogmus monochrous (Chaudoir, 1865)
 Prosopogmus namoyensis Sloane, 1895
 Prosopogmus occidentalis (Macleay, 1888)
 Prosopogmus oghisensis Will, 2011
 Prosopogmus oodiformis (Macleay, 1871)
 Prosopogmus opacidermis Sloane, 1923
 Prosopogmus punctifer Sloane, 1920
 Prosopogmus reichei (Castelnau, 1867)
 Prosopogmus rubricornis Sloane, 1895
 Prosopogmus savesi Fauvel, 1882
 Prosopogmus sulcatulus (Chaudoir, 1873)
 Prosopogmus suspectus (Chaudoir, 1878)
 Prosopogmus tasmanicus Sloane, 1920
 Prosopogmus yarrensis Sloane, 1915

References

Pterostichinae